Sunset Beach is a beach located on the Cape May Peninsula, in Lower Township, New Jersey, near Cape May Point,  along the Delaware Bay, in the U.S. state of New Jersey. It is a local tourist attraction due in part to its proximity to the SS Atlantus, also known as the Concrete Ship, and the Cape May Lighthouse.

Attractions 
Sunset Beach is known for a flag raising-lowering ceremony, which is held daily from Memorial Day weekend through August, and on Saturdays in September. All the flags flown in the ceremony are flags from the caskets of veterans. The ceremony has been taking place on Sunset beach since 1973. Other attractions include Cape May diamonds, clear quartz crystals that can be easily found along the beach's length; the SS Atlantus, a partially submerged concrete ship; summer fireworks.

Ecology
Many whales are seen from May to December, while migratory birds are seen in the spring and fall. Monarch butterflies use Sunset Beach as a migratory stopover on their way to Mexico from Canada.

References

External links

Mikolasy, Clay (May 25, 2013). "Sunset Beach near Cape May, New Jersey". NJ South.

Beaches of Cape May County, New Jersey
Beaches of New Jersey
Lower Township, New Jersey
Tourist attractions in Cape May County, New Jersey